The Intruder (Spanish:La intrusa) is a 1939 Argentine drama film directed by Julio Saraceni and starring María Esther Buschiazzo, Héctor Calcaño and Olga Casares Pearson.

Cast
 María Esther Buschiazzo
 Héctor Calcaño
 Olga Casares Pearson
 Tito Climent
 Vicente Climent
 Josefina Dessein
 Sara Olmos
 Eduardo Sandrini
 Pedro Tocci
 Ángel Walk
 Samuel Santa

References

Bibliography 
 Rist, Peter H. Historical Dictionary of South American Cinema. Rowman & Littlefield, 2014.

External links 

1939 films
Argentine drama films
1939 drama films
1930s Spanish-language films
Films directed by Julio Saraceni
Argentine black-and-white films
1930s Argentine films